The genocide of the Ingrian Finns was a series of events triggered by the Russian Revolution in the 20th century, in which the Soviet Union deported, imprisoned and killed Ingrians and destroyed their culture. In the process, Ingria, in the historical sense of the word, ceased to exist. Before the persecution there were 140,000 to 160,000 Ingrians in Russia and today approximately 19,000 (after several thousands repatriated since 1990).

From 1935 onwards, the genocide manifested itself in deportations of entire Ingrian villages, mass arrests and executions, especially in 1937 and 1938 associated with the Great Purge. The reason for the genocide was the skeptical attitude of the Soviet Union towards the Ingrian people due to their close cultural and historical relations with Finland. At the same time, many other ethnic groups and minorities were also persecuted.

The destruction process targeted at Ingrian Finns was centrally managed and considered. Russian legislation in the 1990s refers to it as genocide. The aim was, in particular, to assassinate the male population. Tens of thousands of Ingrians died due to deportations and in labor camps.

Background 
The Ingrian Finns were mainly independent small farmers in the 1920s and still in the early 1930s with relatively high literacy. They were predominantly Lutheran. Ingria was located in the vicinity of Leningrad, where they formed the second largest ethnic group after Russians in the 1930s. Ingrians were targeted from 1930 onwards. Red refugees who lost the Finnish Civil War took charge in the area. They forced propaganda for collectivization of the agriculture, reported the priests, helped arrest people and harassed Ingrian Finns and "Kulaks".

In addition to independent farmers, the Soviet regime attacked educated people, such as teachers, as well as religious leadership throughout the Soviet Union. Ingrian Lutheran Church workers were imprisoned, sent to forced labor, deported, and executed. Ingrian churches were converted into clubs and warehouses. Teaching in Finnish was banned in schools in 1937. Ingrian village councils, cultural institutions and magazines were abolished. Ingrian Finns were terrorized and coerced in ways that would now be described by the terms “genocide” and “ethnic cleansing”.

In 1926, the number of Ingrians was estimated to be at 115,000. In the period of 1929–1931, 18,000, in 1935 about 7,000 and in 1935–1936, a total of 26,000–27,000 persons were deported. The deported people ended up in working camps and their mortality was high. The deportations were carried out in a hurry and the housing, food and health care of the targeted people were severely deficient. Between 1929 and 1938, a total of 60,000 Ingrians, half of the Ingrian population, were imprisoned and deported.

Aftermath
During World War II, the Ingrian people were once again forcibly deported from their homeland for ethnic reasons, and even after the war they were prevented from returning to their homeland until 1954. The Ingrian people deported to Siberia were placed in prison camps. The Soviet Union was silent about the Ingrians and they did not officially exist. It was not until the dissolution of the Soviet Union in 1990 that Russia sought to improve their situation with new legislation.

By 1970, the Ingrian Finn population decreased by 50,000 people, a 43% decline from the 1928 population, which political scientist Rein Taagepera described as a "clear case of genocide".

See also 
 Ingrians
 Deportation of the Ingrian Finns
 Anti-Finnish sentiment

References

Books

1930s crimes in Europe
1930s in the Soviet Union
Baltic Finns
Ingria
Genocides in Europe
Massacres committed by the Soviet Union